Molly Irene Samuel-Leport MBE (born 12 September 1961 in London, England) is a British karateka, community leader and political candidate. She has a 6th Dan black belt in karate and is the winner of multiple European Karate Championships. Samuel-Leport received the 1989 Sunday Times International Sports Woman of the Year and 1987 Jamaican Jubilee Award for Excellence.

She was appointed Member of the Order of the British Empire (MBE) in the 2015 New Year Honours for services to karate.

Achievements
 1986 European Karate Championships Kumite Gold Medal
 1986 World Karate Championships Kumite Silver Medal
 1987 European Karate Championships Kumite Gold Medal
 1989 European Karate Championships Kumite Gold Medal
 1990 World Karate Championships Kumite Bronze Medal
 1991 European Karate Championships Kumite Gold Medal
 1992 European Karate Championships Kumite Gold Medal
 1992 World Karate Championships Kumite Gold Medal
 1993 World Games Gold Medal

Politics
Samuel-Leport was the Conservative PPC for Walthamstow in the 2015 general election. She polled 5,584 votes, which was 13.4% of the overall vote. This was the first time the Conservatives had finished in second place in the constituency since 2001.

At the 2017 general election, she was selected again to contest the seat where she finished  in second again, increasing her vote share.

She stood as the Conservative Party candidate for Brent and Harrow for the 2021 London Assembly election, coming second, and as a Conservative Party candidate for Upper Walthamstow ward in the 2022 Waltham Forest London Borough Council election, coming fourth in the two-member ward.

References

External links
 

1961 births
Living people
British female karateka
Karate coaches
Isshin-ryū practitioners
Sportspeople from London
Black British sportswomen
Members of the Order of the British Empire
British sportsperson-politicians
Conservative Party (UK) parliamentary candidates
Black British women politicians
English people of Jamaican descent
World Games gold medalists
Competitors at the 1993 World Games
World Games medalists in karate